Flesh and Blood is a 1968 television film directed by Arthur Penn from an original teleplay by William Hanley. The film aired 26 January 1968 on NBC.

Cast
 Edmond O'Brien (Harry)
 Kim Stanley (Della)
 E.G. Marshall (John)
 Kim Darby (Faye)
 Suzanne Pleshette (Nona)
 Robert Duvall (Howard)

Production
The TV movie was filmed on East 26th Street, Manhattan, and at JC Studios, Brooklyn, New York City.

References

External links 

Films directed by Arthur Penn
1968 television films
1968 films
NBC network original films
1960s English-language films